Wagimo is a small East Asian (Ussuri, Myanmar, China, Korea, Japan) genus of butterflies in the family Lycaenidae.

Cladogram from Catalogue of Life:

References
"Wagimo Sibatani & Ito, 1942" at Markku Savela's Lepidoptera and Some Other Life Forms

External links
Images representing Wagimo at Encyclopedia of Life

Theclini
Lycaenidae genera